Peter John Rose (born 8 June 1955) is an Australian poet, memoirist, critic, novelist and editor. For many years he was an academic publisher. Since 2001 he has been editor of Australian Book Review.

Career

Peter Rose was born in Wangaratta on 8 June 1955, and grew up there. Rose belongs to a famous Collingwood Football Club family. His father, Bob, was a celebrated Collingwood player and coach. His brother, Robert (1952–1999), also played for Collingwood and, as a cricketer, opened the batting for Victoria. Rose was educated at Haileybury, Melbourne and Monash University.

Throughout the 1990s Rose was a publisher at Oxford University Press, Australia, where he published a wide range of Oxford reference books and dictionaries. Since 2001 he has been the editor of the Australian Book Review. He has also edited two poetry anthologies.

In 2001, Rose published Rose Boys, a family memoir which won the National Biography Award in 2003. Rose Boys was reissued as a Text Classic in 2013.

In 2009 he appeared on the judging panel for the Prime Minister's Literary Awards, and in 2011 he judged the National Biography Award. He has for more than a decade been chairperson of the Robert Rose Foundation, which assists people with spinal cord injuries. An extensive selection of his poetry appears in the Australian Poetry Library.

Rose's poetry has won several awards. The collection Crimson Crop, published in 2012, won a Queensland Literary Award and has been shortlisted for the 2013 Prime Minister's Literary Award.

Personal life
He has acknowledged his homosexuality, and his work has appeared in the anthology Out of the box : contemporary Australian gay and lesbian poets.

He lives in Melbourne.

Bibliography

Poetry

Collections

 Donatello in Wangaratta, Hale & Iremonger, 1998 
 Rattus Rattus: New and Selected Poems, Salt Publications, 2005 
 Crimson Crop, UWA Publishing, 2012 
 The Subject of Feeling, UWA Publishing, 2015

List of poems

Memoir
 Rose Boys, Allen & Unwin, 2001 
 Rose Boys, Text Classics, 2013

Fiction
 A Case of Knives, Allen & Unwin, 2005 
 Roddy Parr, Fourth Estate, 2010, ISN 9780732290276

Anthology
 The Best Australian Poems 2007, Black Inc., 2007 
 The Best Australian Poems 2008, Black Inc., 2008

Book and other reviews

References

External links
 Dynasties - The Rose Family
 Collingwood Football Club
 Prime Minister's Literary Awards
 The Robert Rose Foundation
 Australian Poetry Library

Living people
1955 births
Australian Book Review people
Australian editors
Australian male novelists
Australian male poets
Australian memoirists
Gay poets
Gay novelists
Australian LGBT novelists
Australian LGBT poets
Meanjin people